Raja Bahadur Kirtyanand Sinha (1880-1938) was an Indian businessman and philanthropist.

Life

Sinha gained a Bachelor of Arts from Allahabad University. He wrote three books: Purnea, a Shikarland; Shikar in Hills and Jungles; and Homeopathic Practice.

He contributed to the establishment of T.N.B College in Bhagalpur, which was in need of funds, having been established in the 1880s. Sinha contributed "60 acres of land and 6 lakhs of rupees in cash for the construction of building and other developmental work". For this contribution and other acts of charity, he was awarded the title of Raja in June 1914.

On 9 July 1917, he was appointed as a government nominee to the Champaran Agrarian Committee, which had been set up to resolve the issue of indigo planters in Champaran following the Champaran Satyagraha by Mahatma Gandhi. On this committee, he worked with Gandhi, and for his work he was awarded the title of Raja Bahadur in 1919. On the request and appeal made by Sri Braj Mohan Thakur, Raja Bahadur Krityanand Singh along with Raja Tank Nath Choudhary created separately a chair of Maithili in Calcutta University

He was one of the founders of the Bank of Bihar, which is now the Bihar State Cooperative Bank Limited. He also started a Banaili Iron and Steel Works in Sitarampur in Asansol, referred to in the book on India's economy written by historian Amiya Kumar Bagchi and also in a book Bihar published by the National Book Trust. This venture did not survive the Great Depression.

The Raja, along with the Maharaja of Darbhanga, sponsored the first flight over Mount Everest in 1933. "The Raja of Banaili, a cheery personality, who had shot over hundred tigers, offered us his fleet of motor-cars, remarking that, if possible, he would like to retain one or two of his own. He had seventeen. He seemed astonished, as if at an unusual display of moderation, when only three cars and a lorry were required."

The Raja issued the first official state invitation to Salamat Ali & Ali Khan of the Sham Chaurasia gharana in 1934. Salamat Ali Khan was then 11 years old and Ali Khan was 13 years. They were invited to perform at the Dussehra festival in Champanagar Deorhi (Palace) and the royal host liked their rendition of Malkauns so much that he would not let them leave Champanagr. The duo stayed under the patronage of the Raja for a few months, and some believe that their Basant Bahar composition "Des des ki thi jung dushman sab har gaye" praises the Raja.

Another musician, Altaf Hussain Khan of Khurja, served as a court musician in the darbar of the Raja. Altaf Hussain Khan also gave music lessons to Raja's eldest son, Rajkumar Shyamanand Sinha.

Sinha stayed in public life until his death in 1938. His place of residence remained the Champanagar Deorhi in Purnia inherited from his father.

See also
Banaili
Raj Darbhanga
Maharaja Lakshmeshwar Singh

Gallery

References

1938 deaths
People from Bihar
1880 births
20th-century Indian philanthropists